The Lynx reconnaissance vehicle (manufacturer's name: M113½ Command and Reconnaissance Vehicle, abbr. M113 C&R) is a United States-built tracked reconnaissance armoured fighting vehicle, which was employed by the armed forces of the Netherlands and Canada. Dutch vehicles were exported in the 1990s to Bahrain and Chile, according to SIPRI 150 and 8 vehicles respectively.

The M113½ was developed in 1963 as a private venture by FMC Corp., the manufacturer of the M113. It competed with the M114 but the US Army chose the M114 for production. The design was then offered to foreign buyers and gained the name Lynx when purchased by Canada.

The Lynx was based on the M113, including its aluminum armor and many details of its construction. However, it is shorter in both length and height, and has four road wheels instead of five. This reduction in size led to a significant reduction in weight as well, dropping to about 8 tonne compared to over 12 for the original M113. The engine was moved to the rear and offered in gas and diesel versions.

The Lynx is amphibious, propelled in the water by its tracks. Before swimming, a trim vane is erected at front, bilge pumps started, and covers mounted on the air intake and exhaust. In practice, crews would close hatches and ford shallow streams at high speed.

Service history
The Royal Netherlands Army accepted 250 vehicles, beginning in 1966. The Dutch version of the Lynx has the driver front-left, radio operator/7.62mm machine gunner front-right, and a .50-calibre machine gun cupola centre. In the 1970s, the heavy machine gun was replaced by an Oerlikon-Bührle GBD-ADA turret mounting a 25mm KBA cannon. Dutch vehicles were later exported to Bahrain. The Dutch designated their vehicles the M113 C&V

The Canadian Forces accepted 174 vehicles from 1968. Lynx's were issued to the reconnaissance squadron of an armoured regiment (D Sqn), as well as to squadrons of the armoured regiment assigned to the reconnaissance role, one squadron retaining the Ferret scout car. The squadron consisted of three troops, each equipped with five Lynxes, two two-vehicle patrols plus the troop leader's vehicle, four troops per squadron for the reconnaissance regiment. (Militia [reserve] armoured reconnaissance units trained for the role with Jeeps or Iltis 4×4 trucks). In addition, nine Lynxes equipped the reconnaissance platoon of an infantry battalion's combat support company, as well as the reconnaissance sections of combat engineer field troops.

In the Canadian Lynx, the crew commander's cupola is located middle-right, and the observer's hatch was rear-left. The commander operates the manually traversed M26 heavy machine gun cupola from inside the vehicle, but reloads it with the hatch open. The rear-facing observer operates the radio and fires the pintle-mounted 7.62mm machine gun. Behind the commander, on the floor, was a drop-down escape hatch.

The Canadian Lynx was withdrawn from service in 1993, and replaced by 203 Coyote eight-wheeled reconnaissance vehicles by the end of 1996.

Operators
  (M113 C&V; Status Unknown)
  (Lynx; Former) Phased out in the 1990s
  (M113 C&V; Status Unknown)
 
  (M113 C&V; Former) Phased out in the 1990s
  (Lynx; Tested Only)
  (Both Variants; Tested only)

Survivors

Existing Lynxes include several monuments and museum pieces, and a few running vehicles. This list only includes the M113 C&R prototypes and Lynx's. It does not include surviving Dutch M113 C&Vs.

British Columbia
J.R. Vicars Armoury, Kamloops, British Columbia
British Columbia Dragoons Regimental Headquarters, (B Squadron) Kelowna, British Columbia
Vernon Military Camp, Vernon, British Columbia (2 at this location, one in UN Colours)

Alberta
CFB Edmonton, 1 Lynx on display at the Steele Barracks entrance
The Military Museums, Calgary, Alberta
Royal Canadian Legion, Fort Saskatchewan, Alberta
Evansburg Cenotaph, Evansburg, Alberta*

Saskatchewan
LCol D.V. Currie VC Armoury, Moose Jaw, Saskatchewan (Saskatchewan Dragoons), has two Lynxes, in camouflage and UN peacekeeping colours

Manitoba
McGregor Armoury, Winnipeg, Manitoba (Fort Garry Horse)
CFB Shilo, One monument at main gate, second Lynx awaiting restoration to operable condition in RCA Museum.

Ontario
Canadian Army 4th Division Training Center/Land Forces Central Area Training Center (LFCA TC) MEAFORD, Meaford, Ontario (Located at the main gate historic tank park)
Cornwall Armoury, Cornwall, Ontario
31 Combat Engineer Regiment (The Elgins), St. Thomas Armoury, St. Thomas, Ontario
CFB Petawawa, Worthington Barracks, Petawawa, Ontario
Base Borden Military Museum, Borden, Ontario
Canadian Forces College, Toronto, Ontario
Wolseley Barracks, London, Ontario
Denison Armoury, Toronto, Ontario. (in storage in training area next to DRDC)

Quebec
CFB Valcartier, Valcartier, Quebec, in UN peacekeeping colours.
Salaberry Armoury, Gatineau, Quebec (Régiment de Hull)
Côte-des-Neiges Armoury, Montreal, Quebec (Royal Canadian Hussars)
Les Fusiliers de Sherbrooke, Sherbrooke, Québec
Les Fusiliers du St-Laurent, Rivière du loup, Québec

New Brunswick
CFB Gagetown Military Museum, Oromocto, New Brunswick 
8th Hussars Military Museum, Sussex, New Brunswick

Nova Scotia
Fort Petrie Military Museum, New Victoria, Cape Breton Island, Nova Scotia

Prince Edward Island
The Prince Edward Island Regiment has two on display in Summerside and Charlottetown

Newfoundland
Gallipoli Armory, Corner Brook, Newfoundland & Labrador
 Royal Canadian Legion, Pasadena, Newfoundland

Europe
Overloon War Museum, Overloon, the Netherlands 
Musée des Blindés, Saumur, France

Running Lynxes
 * CFB Borden Museum, Borden , Ontario maintains 1 operating Lynx that is used in Military funerals etc., it is on display in       the museum)
 The British Columbia Regiment (Duke of Connaught's Own), Vancouver, BC, has one operational Lynx.
 Ontario Regiment museum in Oshawa, Ontario, maintains four fully operational Lynxes in its collection. Two are painted CF o/d green, one UN white, the other in CF winter camouflage.
 Lincoln & Welland Regimental Museum, St Catharines, Ontario, has one operational Lynx.
 Bovington Tank Museum, Dorset, England, has shown an operating Lynx.
 Lord Strathcona's Horse, Edmonton, Alberta, has a running Lynx in their Historical Vehicle Troop.
 The Canadian War Museum, Ottawa, Ontario, has a running Lynx.
 FAMAE, Fuerte baquedano, Chile, has a running Lynx
 Private Collector, Northeast USA; a running Lynx that has been shown at various shows across the US
 Private collector in the Calgary Alberta region

M113 C&R Prototypes
 Panzer Fabrik, Colorado, USA; an unrestored but running M113 C&R prototype formerly of the Littlefield Collection. The vehicle is missing its turret
 American Armory Museum, California, USA; a restored M113 C&R prototype SN #2 of 10 formally of the Littlefield Collection. The vehicle is unique in the way that the side hatch swings out from the side and not a "gull-wing" hatch of the production M113 C&V

References

Bibliography
 
  (site gone)
 
  – employment of the Lynx by the 8th Canadian Hussars in Cyprus, 1978–79
 Foss, Christopher F. (1987). Jane's AFV Recognition Handbook, pp 154–55. London: Jane's. .

External links

 Photographs

Cold War armored fighting vehicles of the United States
Armoured personnel carriers of the Cold War
Armoured fighting vehicles of Canada
Reconnaissance vehicles of the United States
Tracked reconnaissance vehicles
FMC Corporation